Hajndl is a small settlement immediately west of Ormož in northeastern Slovenia. The area belongs to the traditional region of Styria and is now included in the Drava Statistical Region.

References

External links
Hajndl on Geopedia

Populated places in the Municipality of Ormož